The 2014 Pittsburgh Pirates season was the franchise's 128th season as a member of the National League, 133rd season overall, and 14th season at PNC Park. The regular season began with a win at home against the Chicago Cubs on March 31 and ended with a loss at Great American Ball Park against the Cincinnati Reds on September 28. The Pirates finished the regular season in second place for the second consecutive year in the National League Central Division with 88 wins and 74 losses.

The team clinched their second consecutive playoff berth with a victory on September 23. Also for the second consecutive season, however, the Pirates finished in second in their division behind the defending National League champion St. Louis Cardinals. The team secured one of two NL Wild Card spots, as well as home field advantage for the 2014 National League Wild Card Game. However, they lost the October 1 playoff game to the San Francisco Giants, thus eliminating them from the 2014 postseason.

Three members of the 2014 Pirates were selected to represent the National League in the All-Star Game. In addition, two Pirates players were named NL Player of the Month: Andrew McCutchen in June and Josh Harrison in August. During the 2014 season, the franchise season attendance record (2,435,867, set during PNC Park's inaugural 2001 season) was broken on September 21, the final home game of the season and 23rd sellout of the year (tying the franchise sellout record set in 2013). The new record stood at 2,442,564 until being broken in the 2015 season.

Season standings

National League Central

National League playoff standings

Record vs. opponents

Detailed records

Regular season

Game log

|- bgcolor=#ccffcc
| 1 || March 31 || Cubs || 1–0 (10) || Morris (1–0) || Villanueva (0–1) || — || 39,833 || 1–0
|-  bgcolor=

|- bgcolor=#ccffcc
| 2 || April 2 || Cubs || 4–3 (16) || Pimentel (1–0) || Villanueva (0–2) || — || 29,762 || 2–0
|-  bgcolor=#ffbbbb
| 3 || April 3 || Cubs || 2–3 || Hammel (1–0) || Rodríguez (0–1) || Strop (1) || 11,418 || 2–1
|- bgcolor=#ccffcc
| 4 || April 4 || Cardinals || 12–2 || Cole (1–0) || Miller (0–1) || — || 23,342 || 3–1
|- bgcolor=#ffbbbb
| 5 || April 5 || Cardinals || 1–6 || Kelly (1–0) || Liriano (0–1) || — || 30,092 || 3–2
|- bgcolor=#ccffcc
| 6 || April 6 || Cardinals || 2–1 || Watson (1–0) || Wainwright (1–1) || Grilli (1) || 25,704 || 4–2
|- bgcolor=#ccffcc
| 7 || April 8 || @ Cubs || 7–6 || Watson (2–0) || Strop (0–1) || Grilli (2) || 26,177 || 5–2
|- bgcolor=#ffbbbb
| 8 || April 9 || @ Cubs || 5–7 || Hammel (2–0) || Rodríguez (0–2) || — || 28,247 || 5–3
|- bgcolor=#ccffcc
| 9 || April 10 || @ Cubs || 5–4 || Cole (2–0) || Russell (0–1) || Grilli (3) || 25,502 || 6–3
|- bgcolor=#ffbbbb
| 10 || April 11 || @ Brewers || 2–4 || Peralta (1–0) || Liriano (0–2) || Rodríguez (3) || 27,469 || 6–4
|- bgcolor=#ffbbbb
| 11 || April 12 || @ Brewers || 2–3 || Henderson (1–0) || Melancon (0–1) || Rodríguez (4) || 42,828 || 6–5
|- bgcolor=#ffbbbb
|| 12 || April 13 || @ Brewers || 1–4 || Lohse (2–1) || Morton (0–1) || Smith (1) || 32,152 || 6–6
|- bgcolor=#ccffcc
| 13 || April 14 || @ Reds || 8–7 || Morris (2–0) || LeCure (0–1) || Grilli (4) || 17,756 || 7–6
|- bgcolor=#ffbbbb
| 14 || April 15 || @ Reds || 5–7 || Leake (2–1) || Cole (2–1) || Broxton (1) || 18,462 || 7–7
|- bgcolor=#ffbbbb
| 15 || April 16 || @ Reds || 0–4 || Cueto (1–2) || Liriano (0–3) || — || 16,825 || 7–8
|- bgcolor=#ccffcc
| 16 || April 17 || Brewers || 11–2 || Vólquez (1–0) || Wooten (0–1) || — || 17,584 || 8–8
|- bgcolor=#ffbbbb
| 17 || April 18 || Brewers || 3–5 || Lohse (3–1) || Morton (0–2) || Rodríguez (5) || 31,564 || 8–9
|- bgcolor=#ffbbbb
| 18 || April 19 || Brewers || 7–8 || Henderson (2–0) || Grilli (0–1) || Rodríguez (6) || 32,490 || 8–10
|- bgcolor=#ffbbbb
| 19 || April 20 || Brewers || 2–3 (14) || Duke (1–0) || Gómez (0–1) || Rodríguez (7) || 21,761 || 8–11
|- bgcolor=#ccffcc
| 20 || April 21 || Reds || 6–5 || Hughes (1–0) || Hoover (1–2) || — || 12,864 || 9–11
|- bgcolor=#ffbbbb
| 21 || April 22 || Reds || 1–4 || Cueto (2–2) || Vólquez (1–1) || — || 11,926 || 9–12
|- bgcolor=#ffbbbb
| 22 || April 23 || Reds || 2–5 || Simón (3–1) || Morton (0–3) || Broxton (3) || 16,705 || 9–13
|- bgcolor=#ffbbbb
| 23 || April 24 || Reds || 1–2 || Cingrani (2–2) || Cumpton (0–1) || Broxton (4) || 18,896 || 9–14
|- bgcolor=#ffbbbb
| 24 || April 25 || @ Cardinals || 0–1 || Miller (2–2) || Cole (2–2) || Rosenthal (7) || 43,193 || 9–15
|- bgcolor=#ccffcc
| 25 || April 26 || @ Cardinals || 6–1 || Pimentel (2–0) || Lyons (0–2) || — || 46,254 || 10–15
|- bgcolor=#ffbbbb
| 26 || April 27 || @ Cardinals || 0–7 || Wainwright (5–1) || Vólquez (1–2) || — || 41,986 || 10–16
|- style="text-align:center; background:#bbb;"
| — || April 29 || @ Orioles || colspan=6| PPD, RAIN; rescheduled for May 1
|- style="text-align:center; background:#bbb;"
| — || April 30 || @ Orioles || colspan=6| PPD, RAIN; rescheduled for May 1
|-

|- bgcolor=#ffbbbb
| 27 || May 1 || @ Orioles || 1–5 || Norris (2–2) || Morton (0–4) || Hunter (7) || — || 10–17
|- bgcolor=#ffbbbb
| 28 || May 1 || @ Orioles || 5–6 (10) || Hunter (1–0) || Pimentel (2–1) || — || 28,290 || 10–18
|- bgcolor=#ccffcc
| 29 || May 2 || Blue Jays || 6–5 || Melancon (1–1) || Santos (0–2) || — || 24,547 || 11–18
|- bgcolor=#ccffcc
| 30 || May 3 || Blue Jays || 8–6 || Morris (3–0) || Redmond (0–3) || Melancon (1) || 31,439 || 12–18
|- bgcolor=#ffbbbb
| 31 || May 4 || Blue Jays || 2–7 || McGowan (2–1) || Vólquez (1–3) || — || 29,496 || 12–19
|- bgcolor=#ffbbbb
| 32 || May 5 || Giants || 10–11 (13) || Machi (5–0) || Hughes (1–1) || Romo (10) || 13,675 || 12–20
|- bgcolor=#ccffcc
| 33 || May 6 || Giants || 2–1 || Watson (3–0) || Hudson (4–2) || — || 18,881 || 13–20
|- bgcolor=#ccffcc
| 34 || May 7 || Giants || 4–3 || Cole (3–2) || Lincecum (2–2) || Melancon (2) || 23,975 || 14–20
|- bgcolor=#ccffcc
| 35 || May 9 || Cardinals || 6–4 || Wilson (1–0) || Martínez (0–2) || Melancon (3) || 33,696 || 15–20
|- bgcolor=#ccffcc
| 36 || May 10 || Cardinals || 4–3 || Hughes (2–1) || Lynn (4–2) || Melancon (4) || 34,914 || 16–20
|- bgcolor=#ffbbbb
| 37 || May 11 || Cardinals || 5–6 || Miller (5–2) || Morton (0–5) || Rosenthal (10) || 32,065 || 16–21 
|- bgcolor=#ffbbbb
| 38 || May 13 || @ Brewers || 2–5 || Estrada (3–1) || Cole (3–3) || Rodríguez (16) || 24,176 || 16–22
|- bgcolor=#ccffcc
| 39 || May 14 || @ Brewers || 4–1 || Watson (4–0) || Rodríguez (1–1) || Melancon (5) || 24,962 || 17–22
|- bgcolor=#ffbbbb
| 40 || May 15 || @ Brewers || 3–4 || Wooten (1–1) || Melancon (1–2) || — || 34,743 || 17–23 
|- style="text-align:center; background:#bbb;"
| — || May 16 || @ Yankees || colspan=6| PPD, RAIN; rescheduled for May 18
|- bgcolor=#ffbbbb
| 41 || May 17 || @ Yankees || 1–7 || Phelps (1–0) || Vólquez (1–4) ||   —|| 47,353 || 17–24
|- bgcolor=#ffbbbb
| 42 || May 18 || @ Yankees || 3–4 || Kuroda (3–3) || Morton (0–6) || Robertson (8) || — || 17–25
|- bgcolor=#ccffcc
| 43 || May 18 || @ Yankees || 5–3 || Cole (4–3) || Aceves (0–2) || Melancon (6) || 46,858 || 18–25
|- bgcolor=#ffbbbb
| 44 || May 20 || Orioles || 2–9 || González (2–3) || Liriano (0–4) || — || 22,787 || 18–26
|- bgcolor=#ccffcc
| 45 || May 21 || Orioles || 9–8 || Morris (4–0) || Webb (2–1) || Melancon (7) || 19,365 || 19–26
|- bgcolor=#ccffcc
| 46 || May 22 || Nationals || 3–1 || Vólquez (2–4) || Treinen (0–2) || Melancon (8) || 23,468 || 20–26
|- bgcolor=#ccffcc
| 47 || May 23 || Nationals || 4–3 || Morton (1–6) || Zimmerman (3–2) || Grilli (5) || 31,592 || 21–26
|- bgcolor=#ccffcc
| 48 || May 24 || Nationals || 3–2 || Hughes (3–1) || Strasburg (3–4) || Melancon (9) || 38,889 || 22–26
|- bgcolor=#ffbbbb
| 49 || May 25 || Nationals || 2–5 || Fister (2–1) || Liriano (0–5) || Soriano (11) || 38,047 || 22–27
|- bgcolor=#ccffcc
| 50 || May 26 || @ Mets || 5–3 || Watson (5–0) || Valverde (1–1) || Melancon (10) || 29,309 || 23–27
|- bgcolor=#ffbbbb
| 51 || May 27 || @ Mets || 2–4 || Black (1–0) || Gómez (0–2) || Mejía (4) || 20,263 || 23–28
|- bgcolor=#ffbbbb
| 52 || May 28 || @ Mets || 0–5 || Colón (4–5) || Morton (1–7) || Familia (1) || 34,839 || 23–29
|- bgcolor=#ccffcc
| 53 || May 29 || @ Dodgers || 6–3 || Cole (5–3) || League (1–2) || Grilli (6) || 39,643 || 24–29 
|- bgcolor=#ccffcc
| 54 || May 30 || @ Dodgers || 2–1 || Liriano (1–5) || Beckett (3–2) || Grilli (7) || 47,503 || 25–29
|- bgcolor=#ffbbbb
| 55 || May 31 || @ Dodgers || 2–12 || Ryu (6–2) || Cumpton (0–2) || Wright (1) || 49,455 || 25–30
|-

|- bgcolor=#ccffcc
| 56 || June 1 || @ Dodgers || 5–3 || Vólquez (3–4) || Greinke (8–2) || Grilli (8) || 51,020 || 26–30
|- bgcolor=#ccffcc
| 57 || June 2 || @ Padres || 10–3 || Morton (2–7) || Stauffer (2–2) || — || 18,876 || 27–30
|- bgcolor=#ccffcc
| 58 || June 3 || @ Padres || 4–1 || Cole (6–3) || Hahn (0–1) || Grilli (9) || 20,520 || 28–30
|- bgcolor=#ffbbbb
| 59 || June 4 || @ Padres || 2–3 || Kennedy (5–6) || Liriano (1–6) || Street (18) || 17,923 || 28–31
|- bgcolor=#ccffcc
| 60 || June 6 || Brewers || 15–5 || Cumpton (1–2) || Lohse (7–2) || — || 35,544 || 29–31
|- bgcolor=#ffbbbb
| 61 || June 7 || Brewers || 3–9 || Garza (4–4) || Vólquez (3–5) || — || 38,525 || 29–32
|- bgcolor=#ffbbbb
| 62 || June 8 || Brewers || 0–1 || Gallardo (4–4) || Locke (0–1) || Rodríguez (19) || 35,002 || 29–33
|- bgcolor=#ccffcc
| 63 || June 9 || Cubs  || 6–2 || Morton (3–7) || Jackson (4–6) || — || 24,075 || 30–33
|- bgcolor=#ffbbbb
| 64 || June 10 || Cubs  || 3–7 || Wood (6–5) || Sadler (0–1) || — || 31,567 || 30–34
|- bgcolor=#ccffcc
| 65 || June 11 || Cubs  || 4–2 || Cumpton (2–2) || Hammel (6–4) || Grilli (10) || 20,540 || 31–34
|- bgcolor=#ccffcc
| 66 || June 12 || Cubs  || 4–0 || Vólquez (4–5) || Samardzija (2–6) || — || 25,431 || 32–34
|- bgcolor=#ccffcc
| 67 || June 13 || @ Marlins || 8–6 (13) || Gómez (1–2) || Dunn (5–4) || — || 19,054 || 33–34
|- bgcolor=#ccffcc
| 68 || June 14 || @ Marlins || 8–6 || Morton (4–7) || Wolf (1–3) || Grilli (11) || 21,195 || 34–34
|- bgcolor=#ffbbbb
| 69 || June 15 || @ Marlins || 2–3 (10) || Ramos (4–0) || Hughes (3–2) || — || 25,953 || 34–35
|- bgcolor=#ffbbbb
| 70 || June 17 || Reds|| 5–6 || Ondrusek (2–2) || Grilli (0–2) || Chapman (12) || 23,565 || 34–36
|- bgcolor=#ffbbbb
| 71 || June 18 || Reds || 4–11 || Simón (10–3) || Vólquez (4–6) || — || 23,329 || 34–37
|- bgcolor=#ccffcc
| 72 || June 19 || Reds || 4–3 (12) || Wilson (2–0) || Cingrani (2–8) || — || 30,710 || 35–37
|- bgcolor=#ffbbbb
| 73 || June 20 || @ Cubs  || 3–6 || Jackson (5–7) || Morton (4–8) || Rondón (8) || 36,423 || 35–38
|- bgcolor=#ccffcc
| 74 || June 21 || @ Cubs  || 5–3 || Worley (1–0) || Wood (7–6) || Melancon (11) || 36,563 || 36–38
|- bgcolor=#ccffcc
| 75 || June 22 || @ Cubs  || 2–1 || Cumpton (3–2) || Hammel (6–5) || Melancon (12) || 33,573 || 37–38
|- bgcolor=#ccffcc
| 76 || June 23 || @ Rays || 8–1 || Vólquez (5–6) || Cobb (2–6) || — || 13,175 || 38–38
|- bgcolor=#ccffcc
| 77 || June 24 || @ Rays || 6–5 || Locke (1–1) || Archer (4–5) || Melancon (13) || 14,684 || 39–38
|- bgcolor=#ffbbbb
| 78 || June 25 || @ Rays || 1–5 || Price (6–7) || Morton (4–9) || — || 23,761 || 39–39
|- bgcolor=#ccffcc
| 79 || June 26 || Mets || 5–2 || Worley (2–0) || Matsuzaka (3–2) || Melancon (14) || 36,647 || 40–39
|- bgcolor=#ccffcc
| 80 || June 27 || Mets || 3–2 (11) || Hughes (4–2) || Black (1–2) || — || 37,952 || 41–39
|- bgcolor=#ffbbbb
| 81 || June 28 || Mets || 3–5 || Niese (5–4) || Cole (6–4) || Mejía (8) || 38,930 || 41–40
|- bgcolor=#ccffcc
| 82 || June 29 || Mets || 5–2 || Vólquez (6–6) || Colón (8–6) || Melancon (15) || 37,290 || 42–40
|-

|- bgcolor=#ccffcc
| 83 || July 1 || Diamondbacks || 3–2 || Frieri (1–3) || Reed (1–4) || — || 21,426 || 43–40
|- bgcolor=#ccffcc
| 84 || July 2 || Diamondbacks || 5–1 || Morton (5–9) || Anderson (5–4) || — || 24,161 || 44–40
|- bgcolor=#ffbbbb
| 85 || July 3 || Diamondbacks || 2–10 || McCarthy (3–10) || Worley (2–1) || — || 27,473 || 44–41
|- bgcolor=#ccffcc
| 86 || July 4 || Phillies || 8–2 || Cole (7–4) || Hernández (3–8) || — || 38,977 || 45–41
|- bgcolor=#ccffcc
| 87 || July 5 || Phillies || 3–2 || Vólquez (7–6) || Buchanan (4–5) || Melancon (16) || 37,821 || 46–41
|- bgcolor=#ccffcc
| 88 || July 6 || Phillies || 6–2 || Locke (2–1) || Burnett (5–8) || — || 33,408 || 47–41
|- bgcolor=#ffbbbb
| 89 || July 7 || @ Cardinals || 0–2 || Neshek (3–0) || Wilson (2–1) || — || 42,448 || 47–42
|- bgcolor=#ffbbbb
| 90 || July 8 || @ Cardinals || 4–5 || Rosenthal (1–4) || Frieri (1–4) || — || 43,162 || 47–43
|- bgcolor=#ffbbbb
| 91 || July 9 || @ Cardinals || 2–5 || Lynn (10–6) || Cumpton (3–3) || Rosenthal (27) || 43,941 || 47–44
|- bgcolor=#ccffcc
| 92 || July 10 || @ Cardinals || 9–1 || Vólquez (8–6) || Miller (7–8) || — || 43,974 || 48–44
|- bgcolor=#ffbbbb
| 93 || July 11 || @ Reds || 5–6 || Partch (1–0) || Watson (5–1) || Chapman (20) || 36,613 || 48–45
|- bgcolor=#ccffcc
| 94 || July 12 || @ Reds || 6–5 (11) || Wilson (3–1) || Hoover (1–7) || Gómez (1) || 42,789 || 49–45
|- bgcolor=#ffbbbb
| 95 || July 13 || @ Reds || 3–6 || Cueto (10–6) || Liriano (1–7) || Chapman (21) || 35,022 || 49–46
|- bgcolor=#042462
| – || July 15 || 85th All-Star Game || colspan=6 | National League vs. American League (Target Field, Minneapolis)
|- bgcolor=#ccffcc
| 96 || July 18 || Rockies || 4–2 || Watson (6–1) || Belisle (2–5) || Melancon (17) || 37,833 || 50–46
|- bgcolor=#ccffcc
| 97 || July 19 || Rockies || 3–2 (11) || Hughes (5–2) || Bettis (0–2) || — || 37,396 || 51–46
|- bgcolor=#ccffcc
| 98 || July 20 || Rockies || 5–3 || Gómez (2–2) || Belisle (2–6) || Melancon (18) || 35,609 || 52–46
|- bgcolor=#ffbbbb
| 99 || July 21 || Dodgers || 2–5 || Ryu (11–5) || Vólquez (8–7) || Jansen (29) || 28,255 || 52–47
|- bgcolor=#ccffcc
| 100 || July 22 || Dodgers || 12–7 || Worley (3–1) || Maholm (1–5) || — || 30,629 || 53–47
|- bgcolor=#ccffcc
| 101 || July 23 || Dodgers|| 6–1 || Liriano (2–7) || Haren (8–8) || — || 30,785 || 54–47
|- bgcolor=#ffbbbb
| 102 || July 25 || @ Rockies || 1–8 || Anderson (1–3) || Morton (5–10) || — || 38,487 || 54–48
|- bgcolor=#ffbbbb
| 103 || July 26 || @ Rockies || 1–8 || Matzek (2–4) || Locke (2–2) || — || 44,611 || 54–49
|- bgcolor=#ccffcc
| 104 || July 27 || @ Rockies || 7–5 || Watson (7–1) || Brothers (3–5) || Melancon (19) || 40,382 || 55–49
|- bgcolor=#ccffcc
| 105 || July 28 || @ Giants || 5–0 || Worley (4–1) || Bumgarner (12–8) || — || 41,794 || 56–49
|- bgcolor=#ccffcc
| 106 || July 29 || @ Giants || 3–1 || Liriano (3–7) || Hudson (8–8) || Melancon (20) || 42,242|| 57–49
|- bgcolor=#ffbbbb
| 107 || July 30 || @ Giants || 5–7 || Machi (6–0) || Wilson (3–2) || Casilla (8) || 42,272 || 57–50
|- bgcolor=#ffbbbb
| 108 || July 31 || @ Diamondbacks || 4–7 || Pérez (2–1) || Locke (2–3) || Reed (27) || 20,145 || 57–51
|-

|- bgcolor=#ccffcc
| 109 || August 1 || @ Diamondbacks || 9–4 || Watson (8–1) || Schultz (0–1) || — || 22,766 || 58–51
|- bgcolor=#ccffcc
| 110 || August 2 || @ Diamondbacks || 8–3 || Hughes (6–2) || Ziegler (4–2) || — || 33,151 || 59–51
|- bgcolor=#ffbbbb
| 111 || August 3 || @ Diamondbacks || 2–3 (10) || Marshall (4–2) || Melancon (1–3) || — || 26,913 || 59–52
|- bgcolor=#ffbbbb
| 112 || August 5 || Marlins || 3–6 || Ramos (5–0) || Hughes (6–3) || — || 26,734 || 59–53
|- bgcolor=#ccffcc
| 113 || August 6 || Marlins || 7–3 || Locke (3–3) || Koehler (7–9) || — || 26,976 || 60–53
|- bgcolor=#ccffcc
| 114 || August 7 || Marlins || 7–2 || Vólquez (9–7) || Flynn (0–1) || — || 29,035 || 61–53
|- bgcolor=#ccffcc
| 115 || August 8 || Padres || 2–1 || Worley (5–1) || Kennedy (8–10) || Melancon (21) || 38,088 || 62–53
|- bgcolor=#ffbbbb
| 116 || August 9 || Padres || 1–2 || Stults (5–13) || Liriano (3–8) || Benoit (5) || 38,614 || 62–54
|- bgcolor=#ffbbbb
| 117 || August 10 || Padres || 2–8 || Ross (11–10) || Morton (5–11) || — || 38,030 || 62–55
|- bgcolor=#ccffcc
| 118 || August 11 || Tigers || 11–6 || Locke (4–3) || Verlander (10–11) || — || 35,314 || 63–55
|- bgcolor=#ccffcc
| 119 || August 12 || Tigers || 4–2 || Vólquez (10–7) || Ray (1–2) || Melancon (22) || 34,919 || 64–55
|- bgcolor=#ffbbbb
| 120 || August 13 || @ Tigers || 4–8 || Hardy (2–1) || Worley (5–2) || — || 41,043 || 64–56
|- bgcolor=#fffbbbb
| 121 || August 14 || @ Tigers || 2–5 || Scherzer (14–4) || Liriano (3–9) || — || 41,986 || 64–57
|- bgcolor=#ffbbbb
| 122 || August 15 || @ Nationals || 4–5  || Roark (12–7) || Morton (5–12)  || Soriano (29) || 36,945 || 64–58
|- bgcolor=#ffbbbb
| 123 || August 16 || @ Nationals || 3–4  || Thornton (1–0) || Wilson (3–3)  || — || 41,880 || 64–59
|- bgcolor=#ffbbbb
| 124 || August 17 || @ Nationals || 5–6 (11) || Detwiler (2–2) || Cumpton (3–4) || — || 34,430 || 64–60
|- bgcolor=#ffbbbb
| 125 || August 18 || Braves || 3–7 || Santana (13–6) || Worley (5–3) || — || 31,669 || 64–61
|- bgcolor=#ffbbbb
| 126 || August 19 || Braves || 3–11 || Harang (10–7) || Liriano (3–10) || — || 27,033 || 64–62
|- bgcolor=#ccffcc
| 127 || August 20 || Braves || 3–2 || Melancon (2–3) || Carpenter (4–3) || — || 26,581 || 65–62
|- bgcolor=#ccffcc
| 128 || August 22 || @ Brewers || 8–3 || Locke (5–3) || Gallardo (8–7) || — || 37,437 || 66–62
|- bgcolor=#ccffcc
| 129 || August 23 || @ Brewers || 10–2 || Vólquez (11–7) || Peralta (15–8) || — || 40,557 || 67–62
|- bgcolor=#ffbbbb
| 130 || August 24 || @ Brewers || 3–4 || Fiers (4–1) || Worley (5–4) || Rodríguez (39) || 42,761 || 67–63
|- bgcolor=#ffbbbb
| 131 || August 25 || Cardinals || 2–3 || Lackey (13–8) || Hughes (6–4) || Rosenthal (39) || 24,352 || 67–64
|- bgcolor=#ccffcc
| 132 || August 26 || Cardinals || 5–2 || Watson (9–1) || Maness (5–3) || Melancon (23) || 25,521 || 68–64
|- bgcolor=#ccffcc
| 133 || August 27 || Cardinals || 3–1 || Locke (6–3) || Wainwright (15–9) || Melancon (24) || 29,905 || 69–64
|- bgcolor=#ccffcc
| 134 || August 29 || Reds || 2–1 || Watson (10–1) || Broxton (4–2) || Melancon (25) || 37,209 || 70–64
|- bgcolor=#ccffcc
| 135 || August 30 || Reds || 3–2 || Worley (6–4) || Simón (13–9) || Melancon (26) || 38,023 || 71–64
|- bgcolor=#ffbbbb
| 136 || August 31 || Reds || 2–3 || Cueto (16–8) || Hughes (6–5) || Chapman (29) || 37,591 || 71–65
|-

|- bgcolor=#ffbbbb
| 137 || September 1 || @ Cardinals || 4–5 || Maness (6–3) || Cole (7–5) || Rosenthal (41) || 43,347 || 71–66
|- bgcolor=#ffbbbb
| 138 || September 2 || @ Cardinals || 4–6 || Wainwright (16–9) || Locke (6–4) || Neshek (5) || 43,693 || 71–67
|- bgcolor=#ffbbbb
| 139 || September 3 || @ Cardinals || 0-1 || Rosenthal (2–6) || Melancon (2–4) || — || 42,864 || 71–68
|- bgcolor=#ccffcc
| 140 || September 5 || @ Cubs || 5–3 (11) || Melancon (3–4) || Wright (0–3) || Holdzkom (1) || 35,541 || 72–68
|- bgcolor=#ccffcc
| 141 || September 6 || @ Cubs || 5–0 || Liriano (4–10) || Doubront (3–5) || — || 36,867 || 73–68
|- bgcolor=#ccffcc
| 142 || September 7 || @ Cubs || 10–4 || Cole (8–5) || Wood (8–12) || — || 33,894 || 74–68
|- bgcolor=#ccffcc
| 143 || September 8 || @ Phillies || 6–4 || Locke (7–4) || Kendrick (8–12) || Melancon (27) || 23,140 || 75–68
|- bgcolor=#ffbbbb
| 144 || September 9 || @ Phillies || 3–4 || De Fratus (3–1) || Wilson (3–4) || Papelbon (36) || 26,900 || 75–69
|- bgcolor=#ccffcc
| 145 || September 10 || @ Phillies || 6–3 || Worley (7–4) || Williams (5–6) || Melancon (28) || 25,315 || 76–69
|- bgcolor=#ccffcc
| 146 || September 11 || @ Phillies || 4–1 || Liriano (5–10) || Burnett (8–16) || Melancon (29) || 26,535 || 77–69
|- bgcolor=#ccffcc
| 147 || September 12 || Cubs || 7–3 || Cole (9–5) || Wada (4–3) || — || 35,638 || 78–69
|- bgcolor=#ffbbbb
| 148 || September 13 || Cubs || 4–6 || Doubront (4–5) || Locke (7–5) || Rondón (24) || 38,024 || 78–70
|- bgcolor=#ccffcc
| 149 || September 14 || Cubs || 7–3 || Vólquez (12–7) || Turner (5–10) || — || 37,655 || 79–70
|- bgcolor=#ccffcc
| 150 || September 16 || Red Sox || 4–0 || Morton (6–12) || Ranaudo (3–3) || — || 34,698 || 80–70
|- bgcolor=#ccffcc
| 151 || September 17 || Red Sox || 9–1 || Liriano (6–10) || Buchholz (8–9) || — || 34,785 || 81–70
|- bgcolor=#ccffcc
| 152 || September 18 || Red Sox || 3–2 || Cole (10–5) || Workman (1–10) || Melancon (30) || 36,862 || 82–70
|- bgcolor=#ccffcc
| 153 || September 19 || Brewers || 4–2 || Holdzkom (1–0) || Broxton (4–3) || Melancon (31) || 37,974 || 83–70
|- bgcolor=#ffbbbb
| 154 || September 20 || Brewers || 0–1 || Duke (5–1) || Melancon (3–5) || Rodríguez (43) || 39,027 || 83–71
|- bgcolor=#ccffcc
| 155 || September 21 || Brewers || 1–0 || Worley (8–4) || Peralta (16–11) || Watson (1) || 38,650 || 84–71
|- bgcolor=#ccffcc
| 156 || September 22 || @ Braves || 1–0 || Liriano (7–10) || Harang (11–12) || Melancon (32) || 20,252 || 85–71
|- bgcolor=#ccffcc
| 157 || September 23 || @ Braves || 3–2 || Cole (11–5) || Wood (11–11) || Watson (2) || 23,029 || 86–71
|- bgcolor=#ffbbbb
| 158 || September 24 || @ Braves || 2–6 || Teherán (14–13) || Locke (7–6) || Kimbrel (45) || 25,457 || 86–72
|- bgcolor=#ccffcc
| 159 || September 25 || @ Braves || 10–1 || Vólquez (13–7) || Hale (4–5) || — || 35,140 || 87–72
|- bgcolor=#ccffcc
| 160 || September 26 || @ Reds || 3–1 || Hughes (7–5) || Villarreal (0–2) || Melancon (33) || 35,611 || 88–72
|- bgcolor=#ffbbbb
| 161 || September 27 || @ Reds || 6–10 (10) || Axelrod (2–1) || Axford (2–4) || — || 35,268 || 88–73
|- bgcolor=#ffbbbb
| 162 || September 28 || @ Reds || 1–4 || Cueto (20–9) || Watson (10–2) || Chapman (36) || 34,424 || 88–74
|-

|- style="text-align:center;"
| Legend:       = Win       = Loss       = PostponementBold = Pirates team member

Postseason

Wild Card Game

October 1 – National League Wild Card game – The Pirates lost to the San Francisco Giants in the Wild Card Game.

Game log

|- bgcolor=#fcc
| 1 || October 1 || Giants || 0–8 || Bumgarner (1–0) || Vólquez (0–1) || — || 40,629 || 0–1
|-

|- style="text-align:center;"
| Legend:       = Win       = Loss       = PostponementBold = Pirates team member

Roster

Opening Day lineup

Disabled lists

Suspensions/fines

Transactions
The Pirates were involved in the following transactions during the 2014 season:
 Black line marks the transition between off season and regular season 

Legend
  – Invited to training camp

Notable achievements

Awards

Milestones

Statistics

Hitting 
Note: G = Games played; AB = At bats; H = Hits; Avg. = Batting average; HR = Home runs; RBI = Runs batted in

Pitching 
Note: G = Games pitched; IP = Innings pitched; W = Wins; L = Losses; ERA = Earned run average; SO = Strikeouts

Legend
 Stats reflect time with the Pirates only.
† – Denotes player was acquired during season.
‡ – Denotes player was relinquished during season.

Team

Hitting

Pitching

Draft picks

Note
Age at time of draft.

Farm system

References

External links
2014 Pittsburgh Pirates at Baseball Reference
Pittsburgh Pirates official site

Pittsburgh Pirates seasons
Pittsburgh Pirates
Pittsburgh Pirates